Turig may refer to:
 Turig (1)
 Turig (2)
 Turig (3)